2013 Faroe Islands Premier League was the seventy-first season of top-tier football on the Faroe Islands. For sponsorship reasons, it is known as Effodeildin. EB/Streymur were the defending champions.

Teams 

B68 Toftir and FC Suðuroy had finished 9th and 10th respectively at the end of the previous season and were relegated to the 1. deild as a result.

Replacing them were the 1. deild champions 07 Vestur and runners-up AB Argir.

Team summaries

Managerial changes

League table

Positions by round

Results 

The schedule consisted of a total of 27 rounds. Each team played three games against every opponent in no particular order. At least one of the games had to be at home and at least one had to be away. The additional home game for every match-up was randomly assigned prior to the season, with the top five teams of the previous season having 5 home games.

Regular home games

Additional home games

Top goalscorers 

Source: Faroe Soccer

Awards

Team of the season
Source: 
 Goalkeeper:  Teitur Gestsson (HB)
 Defenders:  Bárður Hansen (Víkingur),  Jóhan Troest Davidsen (HB),  Høgni Zachariassen (ÍF),  Pól Jóhannus Justinussen (NSÍ).
 Midfielders:  Christian R. Mouritsen (HB),  Fróði Benjaminsen (HB),  Símun Samuelsen (HB).
 Forwards:  Páll Klettskarð (KÍ),  Klæmint A. Olsen (NSÍ),  Finnur Justinussen (Víkingur).

Goal of the Month

Goal of the Year

See also 
 2013 Faroe Islands Cup
 2013 Faroe Islands Super Cup

References

External links 

  
 Faroe Islands soccer news, results and information
 Faroe Islands soccer news, results, statistics and information

Faroe Islands Premier League seasons
1
Faroe
Faroe